The 1996 Currie Cup was the 58th season of the Currie Cup, South Africa's premier domestic rugby union competition, since it started in 1889. The competition was known as the Bankfin Currie Cup for sponsorship reasons and was contested from 30 May to 24 October 1996. This was also the first season since the advent of professionalism in South African rugby union, which led to a major restructuring in several facets of the sport. The number of provincial unions were reduced from 22 to 14, all of which participated in a single Currie Cup tournament.

Competition rules and information

There were fourteen participating teams in the 1996 Currie Cup. These teams were divided into two sections, Section A and Section B. Teams played all the other teams in their section twice over the course of the season, once at home and once away.

Teams received two points for a win and one point for a draw. The top four teams in each section qualified for the title play-offs. In the quarter finals, the teams that finished first in each section had home advantage against the teams that finished fourth in the other section, while the teams that finished second in each section had home advantage against the teams that finished third in the other section. The winners of these quarter finals advanced to the semi-finals and semi-final winners advanced to the final, in both rounds at the home venue of the higher-placed team.

Teams

Team Listing

Changes from 1995

Following the 1995 Rugby World Cup, rugby union was declared in a professional sport in South Africa. This caused a major restructuring in the rugby unions, which saw the total number of unions reduced from 22 to 14. All of these teams played in the 1996 Currie Cup, which was increased from 6 teams to 14.

Promoted teams:
 
 
 
 
 
 
 
 

Dissolved teams:
  (absorbed into )
  (absorbed into )
  (absorbed into )
  (absorbed into  and )
  (absorbed into )
  (absorbed into )
  (absorbed into )
  (absorbed into )

Log
The final log of the round-robin stage of the 1996 Currie Cup:

Matches

The following matches were played in the 1996 Currie Cup:

Section A

Round one

Round two

Round three

Round four

Round Five

Round Six

Round Seven

Round Eight

Round Nine

Round Ten

Round Eleven

Round Twelve

Round Thirteen

Round Fourteen

Section B

Round one

Round two

Round three

Round four

Round Five

Round Six

Round Seven

Round Eight

Round Nine

Round Ten

Round Eleven

Round Twelve

Round Thirteen

Round Fourteen

Round Fifteen

Title play-offs

Quarter-finals

Semi-finals

Final

Honours

The honour roll for the 1996 Currie Cup was:

Notes

References

 
Currie Cup
Currie Cup